Sweden competed at the 1956 Summer Olympics in Melbourne, Australia, with the exception of the equestrian events, which could not be held in Australia due to quarantine regulations. Instead, those events were held five months earlier in Stockholm, Sweden.

97 competitors, 83 men and 14 women, took part in 74 events in 14 sports in Australia and 6 events in 1 sport in Sweden. Swedish athletes won a total of 19 medals at the games, including 3 golds in the equestrian events held in their own country.

Medalists

Athletics

Men's Marathon
 Jvert Nyberg — 2:31:12 (→ 8th place)
 Thomas Nilsson — 2:33:33 (→ 9th place)
 Arnold Waide — 2:36:21 (→ 11th place)

Boxing

Canoeing

Cycling

Men's Team Time Trial
 Lars NordwallKarl-Ivar AnderssonRoland Ströhm — 47 points (→ 5th place)

Men's Individual Road Race
 Lars Nordwall — 5:23:40 (→ 10th place)
 Karl-Ivar Andersson — 5:23:50 (→ 17th place)
 Roland Ströhm — 5:24:44 (→ 20th place)
 Gunnar Göransson — 5:30:45 (→ 31st place)

Diving

Women's 10m Platform
 Birte Christoffersen-Hanson
 Preliminary Round — 50.48
 Final — 75.21 (→ 8th place)

Equestrian

Dressage
Henri Saint Cyr
Gehnäll Persson
Gustaf Adolf Boltenstern Jr.

Eventing
Hans von Blixen-Finecke Jr.
Petrus Kastenman
Johan Asker

Jumping
Anders Gernandt
Tor Burman
Douglas Wijkander

Fencing

Five fencers, all men, represented Sweden in 1956.

Men's épée
 Per Carleson
 Carl Forssell
 Berndt-Otto Rehbinder

Men's team épée
 Berndt-Otto Rehbinder, Carl Forssell, Per Carleson, Bengt Ljungquist, John Sandwall

Gymnastics

Modern pentathlon

Three male pentathletes represented the Sweden in 1956. Lars Hall won gold in the individual event.

Individual
 Lars Hall
 Bertil Haase
 Björn Thofelt

Team
 Lars Hall
 Bertil Haase
 Björn Thofelt

Rowing

Sweden had nine male rowers participate in two out of seven rowing events in 1956.

 Men's coxed four
 Olle Larsson
 Gösta Eriksson
 Ivar Aronsson
 Evert Gunnarsson
 Bertil Göransson

 Men's eight
 Olle Larsson
 Lennart Andersson
 Kjell Hansson
 Rune Andersson
 Lennart Hansson
 Gösta Eriksson
 Ivar Aronsson
 Evert Gunnarsson
 Bertil Göransson

Sailing

Shooting

Eight shooters represented Sweden in 1956. Olof Sköldberg won a silver in the 100m running deer and John Sundberg won a bronze in the 50 m rifle, three positions.

50 m pistol
 Torsten Ullman
 Åke Lindblom

300 m rifle, three positions
 John Sundberg
 Anders Kvissberg

50 m rifle, three positions
 John Sundberg
 Anders Kvissberg

50 m rifle, prone
 John Sundberg
 Anders Kvissberg

100m running deer
 Olof Sköldberg
 Benkt Austrin

Trap
 Knut Holmqvist
 Hans Liljedahl

Swimming

Weightlifting

Wrestling

References

Nations at the 1956 Summer Olympics
1956
Olympics, Summer